The International Tribunals (Sierra Leone) Act 2007 (c 7) is an Act of the Parliament of the United Kingdom.

Section 1 - The Special Court for Sierra Leone
This section inserted section 77A of the International Criminal Court Act 2001.

See also
 Charles Taylor (Liberia)

References
Halsbury's Statutes

External links
The International Tribunals (Sierra Leone) Act 2007, as amended from the National Archives.
The International Tribunals (Sierra Leone) Act 2007, as originally enacted from the National Archives.

United Kingdom Acts of Parliament 2007
Sierra Leone–United Kingdom relations